A list of Argentine telenovelas.

References

 
Lists of telenovelas
Telenovelas